Gerard Nash may refer to:

 Gerard Nash (bishop) (born 1959), Irish Roman Catholic priest
 Gerard Nash (footballer) (born 1986), Irish former footballer